Barachois was a small hamlet on the Strait of Belle Isle, on the Labrador coast.

See also
List of ghost towns in Newfoundland and Labrador

Ghost towns in Newfoundland and Labrador